Alamara is a 2017 Indian Malayalam-language comedy film directed by Midhun Manuel Thomas and written by John Manthrickal. The film stars Sunny Wayne, Aditi Ravi,  Aju Varghese, Saiju Kurup, Ranji Panicker and Sonu Anna Jacob in main roles.  The film has two songs composed by Sooraj S. Kurup, written by Manu Manjith and sung by Vijay Yesudas and Anju Joseph.

Plot 
The story is narrated by the titular wardrobe and explains how it became a metaphor for the issues caused by parents' interference in the life of a newly married couple. Arun is unable to find a girl to marry due to issues in his horoscope. After his betrothed elopes with her lover, he decides to take a break from the arranged marriage scene and concentrates on his work in Bangalore. His sister requests him to find an accommodation for her friend, Swati, as she is transferred to Bangalore. However, upon meeting her, he is smitten and asks her hand in marriage which she accepts. Meanwhile, a gang of goons loyal to Shetty demands that Arun sell his plot of land to them.

Though his parents are not happy with Swati's proposal, he convinces them to meet her parents to fix the wedding. However, they put forth a condition that Arun's sister's wedding should also happen along with his but she refuses to get married until she gets a bank job. As the fixed date approaches, tensions between the families rise as there is a lack of enthusiasm from Arun's family's side. During a heated argument, Arun's mother calls off the wedding. However, due to Arun's and Swati's persistence, they marry while the families hide their displeasure.

Swati's family gifts the new couple a wooden wardrobe as per the tradition and Arun's mother starts to complain that it is taking up too much space. After moving to Bangalore, Swati nags at Arun to bring the wardrobe to their new house and he reluctantly agrees. Both the families begin to interfere in their lives which lead to petty problems and issues between them. Arun's lawyer requests him to submit the documents related to the disputed plot of land but he realises that it is in the wardrobe which is locked by Swati who is in Mumbai for training. Without any other option, he and friends contact a thief to break the wardrobe's lock and retrieve it. After they are submitted at the police station, the police officer sides with Shetty and argues that the documents are fake. Shetty and his gang encroach the plot but is assaulted and scared off by Arun and friends, with the help of some goons arranged by his uncle.

When Swati returns, she notices that the wardrobe lock is broken and her necklace is stolen. She confronts Arun which leads to a huge fight between them. In addition, Shetty threatens to kill them if he doesn't let go of the plot and leave Bangalore which scares Swati. Swati leaves him and moves back to Kerala. They attend a marriage counselling session which doesn't become successful as their parents don't co-operate. As a result, they get divorced.

Some time later, they both see other potential partners. Afraid of committing to another woman and meeting the same fate as before, he decides to reconcile with Swati. They restart their married life with their parents' approval but by keeping them at a distance.

Cast

References

External links 
 

2017 films
2010s Malayalam-language films
Indian family films
Films scored by Sooraj S. Kurup
 Films directed by Midhun Manuel Thomas
2017 romantic comedy-drama films
Indian romantic comedy-drama films
Films about Indian weddings